The City Transit Division of the Southeastern Pennsylvania Transportation Authority (SEPTA) operate almost all of Philadelphia's public transit, including all six trolley, three trackless trolley, and 70 bus lines within city limits. Some of the bordering municipalities are served by the City Transit division, despite not being part of the city. For example, Cheltenham Township has 13 city division routes and no Suburban Division ones. The City Transit division also operates the 400 Series routes which are designed to serve students attending schools in the city of Philadelphia.

The City Transit Division is broken down into seven districts (Allegheny, Callowhill, Comly, Elmwood, Frankford, Midvale, and Southern) and Contract Operations.



History 
Transit in Philadelphia began with multiple independent horse car, cable, and traction companies, including the privately established entities: Philadelphia Passenger Railway Company, the Thirteenth & Fifteenth Street Passenger Railway Company, West Philadelphia Passenger Railway Company, etc. In 1895 these companies began amalgamating into three large operations: the Electric Traction Company, the People's Traction Company, and the Philadelphia Transportation Company (PTC). The following year they consolidated as the Union Traction Company (UTC). In 1902 UTC went bankrupt; it was reorganized as the Philadelphia Rapid Transit Company (PRT) on July 1.

Despite efforts by Thomas E. Mitten, PRT itself went bankrupt in 1939. A new Philadelphia Transportation Company was formed in 1940 to assume PRT's business. National City Lines (NCL) took over management of the PTC on March 1, 1955, and began a program of converting streetcar lines to bus routes. SEPTA was created in 1962, and purchased PTC's transit operations on September 30, 1968. The former Philadelphia Suburban Transit Company's Red Arrow Lines followed on January 29, 1970, after which SEPTA designated the city services as its "City Transit Division".

Many of today's bus and trackless trolley routes were once streetcar lines. Many of the numbered routes were once lettered or named bus routes.

The first bus route was Route A, established in 1923 between Center City Philadelphia and Frankford Terminal via Strawberry Mansion, Hunting Park Avenue, and Roosevelt Boulevard. Route R replaced Route A along Hunting Park and Roosevelt. Route A then served Roxborough and Andorra within Philadelphia and Barren Hill in Montgomery County. Route A was eliminated and replaced by bus Routes 9, 27, and 32 on February 4, 1984.

List of routes

Numbered routes

Current routes

School routes 
SEPTA operates bus routes numbered in the 400 Series which are designed to serve students attending schools in the city of Philadelphia. Per federal regulations, SEPTA is not allowed to offer charter bus service for the School District of Philadelphia, so all riders are allowed to utilize the 400 Series routes.

Former routes 
Route 41 was used twice: the original Route 41 went along 63rd Street and Market Street from Overbrook to Downtown; this became part of Route 31 and Route 10 after 1957. The second one replaced the part of Route T on Welsh Road on January 31, 1982; this later became part of Route 88.
Route 51 went from Downtown Fairmount Park via 8th and 9th Streets and Columbia Avenue; this was eliminated in 1929 and replaced by rerouted Route 3.
Route 63 went on Catharine & Christian Streets; it was eliminated in September 2003 in exchange for rerouting of Route 64.
Route 69 was used three times: the original Route 69 was replaced by Route 31 on September 10, 1938; the second Route 69 was created on June 30, 1960 from Chester to Buckman Village and Highland Village. Routes 68 and 69 merged into new SEPTA Route 70 on June 18, 1973; the third Route 69 (former Route F) was discontinued on December 7, 1990; it went from Wynnefield along Columbia, Creighton, Jefferson, Parkside, Ford, Conshohocken, Neill, Presidential (it went on Belmont and City going south, and Presidential going north), and Belmont to Manayunk.
Route 71 was used three times: The original Route 71 went from Darby to Media; it was converted to buses on August 13, 1938. By 1944, it was rerouted replacing Route 72. Later, part was replaced by Route 117 and the rest was eliminated. The second use of Route 71 was the Shopper's Special Route Darby-Aldan-Springfield-Lawrence Park-Ardmore Junction; it ran from 1971 to 1972. The third one went from Overbrook to Paoli and Exton. It was replaced by Route 105 on November 28, 1983. The fourth one was a new one initiated in 2004, from Navy Yard to Broad Street. It was discontinued in late 2012 and replaced with the private Navy Yard Shuttle on December 3.
Route 72 was used twice: the first one went from Folsom to Prospect Park via Lincoln Avenue and was replaced by rerouted Route 71 by 1944; the second one went from Darby to Delmar Village; it merged with Route 83 to form Route 115 on June 30, 1986.
Route 74 was used twice: the first one went from Willow Grove to Hatboro and was replaced by part of Route 6 Bus on June 19, 1966; the second one was created on January 29, 1970, and was redesignated as Route 114 on June 30, 1986.
Route 76 was used twice: the first one went from Darby to Marcus Hook and was replaced by an extended Route 113 on November 28, 1983, and the second one was a replacement of Mid-City Loop Ben Franklin line service from 5th and Market to the zoo.
Route 81 was used twice: the first one operated in South Philly along Passyunk Avenue and Snyder Avenue; the section east of Snyder terminal was discontinued between 1954 and 1956; the remainder was discontinued by 1958; the second one operated from Springfield to Decker Square via US 1.
Route 82 was used three times: the first one operated on the Chester-47th Street Line until 1918; the second one went from Chester to Springfield; regular service was discontinued but school service for Cardinal O'Hara ran until 1986 when Ridley Township School District took over the operation. The third was used briefly in the 1990s as "ColumBUS" with service to the Penns Landing area from the Benjamin Franklin Parkway.
Route 83 was used three times: the first one operated on the Island Road Line until 1918; the second one looped on Race, 4th, Market, 3rd Arch, and 7th, and was discontinued in 1953 or 1954; the third one (former Victory Depot Route H) was created on June 16, 1975 from Darby to Brookline; it merged with Route 72 to form Route 115.
Route 85 was used twice: the first one went on the Race and Arch Streets Line until 1914; the second one was discontinued on April 4, 1993, with portions transferred to Route 40; the section on Ford Road has no service now.
Route 86 was used twice: the first one went on the Glenside Short Line until 1913. The second one was rerouted from Grant Avenue to Welsh Road, and continued on Torresdale Avenue to Linden Avenue between 1958 and 1960; it later became part of Route T (later Route 41, now Route 88) and Route 88.
Route 87 went via Northeast Village, Academy Road and Linden Avenue; part became part of Route 20; the rest was discontinued because the Airport had expanded, closing part of the roads Route 87 went on between 1960 and 1964.
Route 90 went on Spruce & Pine Street (east of 8th)/Locust Street (west of 8th) and looped on 26th, South, and 22nd. This was discontinued after 1996 and partially replaced by a rerouted Route 12 along Walnut and Locust Streets.
Route 121 was renumbered from Route 49 on November 26, 1989. It became part of Routes 44 and 52 on February 8, 2009.

Lettered routes

LUCY routes 
The LUCY routes (Loop through University CitY) follow a circular route in University City. There are two lines—Green and Gold—both of which travel along the same streets, but in opposite directions. Technically, there are no terminal stops, but the schedules lists 30th Street Station as its end point although drivers take their layovers on JFK Boulevard just west of 30th Street.

Boulevard Direct 

The Boulevard Direct, which is part of the SEPTA DIRECT BUS brand, operates along Roosevelt Boulevard between the Frankford Transportation Center and the Neshaminy Mall. Boulevard Direct offers limited-stop service along Roosevelt Boulevard, with service operating every 10–15 minutes during most times on weekdays and every 15 minutes on weekends. The service offers improved travel times compared to traditional bus service along Route 14, with more frequent service and several bus stops located on the far side of intersections to improve performance. SEPTA offers a free interchange between the Boulevard Direct and the Route 14 bus for same direction travel. The Boulevard Direct service was launched on October 22, 2017. The Boulevard Direct is operated by the Comly District.

SEPTA Owl Link 
SEPTA Owl Link was an on-demand microtransit service that provided late night connections from City Transit routes to employers in lower Bucks County. The service connected with the Route 14 bus at Horizon Boulevard, the Route 56 bus at the Torresdale & Cottman Loop, and the Route 66 trackless trolley at the City Line Loop. Trips on SEPTA Owl Link were free with a SEPTA Key card. The SEPTA Owl Link service started on May 10, 2021 as a pilot program. The service ended on February 12, 2022.

See also 

SEPTA Suburban Division bus routes
Trolleybuses in Philadelphia

References

External links 
SEPTA bus schedules
Philadelphia Trolley Tracks
Philadelphia Transit Vehicles
Chicago Transit & Railfan Web Site:
Philadelphia Street Railway Companies
Philadelphia Transit Routes
Some 2008 photos of the new trackless trolleys
Photos of 1987's Route 23 Trolley Tour
Studio 34's Eponymous Trolley, or, A Short History of Route 34 

City Transit Division
Bus transportation in Pennsylvania
SEPTA Philadelphia